The 1992–93 IHF Women's Cup Winners' Cup was the seventeenth edition of the European competition for women's handball national cup champions, and the last organized by IHF.

TV Lützellinden, the previous European Cup's runner-up, defeated 1990 champion Rostselmash in the final, becoming the first team from the former Western Bloc to win the Cup Winners' Cup. Yugoslavia, whose team Radnički Belgrade had won the two previous editions, was excluded from the competition in implementation of the UNSC Resolution 575, while Slovenia and Ukraine debuted as independent countries.

Results

References

Women's EHF Cup Winners' Cup
1992 in handball
1993 in handball